Abdulmalek Malwah Al-Shammeri (born 15 August 1995) is a Saudi Arabian professional footballer who plays as a winger or left-back for Al-Raed.

External links

References

Living people
1995 births
Saudi Arabian footballers
Association football wingers
Association football fullbacks
Al-Shabab FC (Riyadh) players
Al Batin FC players
Al-Fayha FC players
Al-Raed FC players
Saudi Professional League players